Acute Exposure Guideline Levels (AEGLs) set levels of chemical concentration that pose a defined level of risk to humans (the general population, including susceptible individuals). These levels are used in preventing and responding to disasters. These guidelines are ascertained for one, short exposure (with a maximum of eight hours) by the air. The AEGL values are determined for varying times of exposure, such as ten minutes, thirty minutes, one hour, four hours and eight hours.

The AEGL values describe the expected effects of inhalation exposure to certain compounds (airborne concentrations in ppm or mg/m3). Each AEGL is determined by different levels of a compound's toxicological effects, based on the 4 Ds: detection, discomfort, disability and death. There are three levels of AEGL-values: AEGL-1, AEGL-2 and AEGL-3. AEGL-1 is the airborne concentration above which notable discomfort or irritation could be experienced. However, the effects are not disabling and reversible once exposure stops. AEGL-2 is the airborne concentration above which irreversible or other serious, long-lasting adverse health effects or an impaired ability to escape could be experienced. AEGL-3 is the airborne concentration above which life-threatening health effects or death could be experienced. An example is shown below for chlorine gas AEGLs:

In this example, several trends can be observed. First, as one moves from AEGL-1 to AEGL-3, the concentrations increase, based on the dose predicted to produce the respective effects (discomfort/irritation vs disability vs death). Second, as one moves from shorter exposures to longer (left to right in the same row), the overall concentration allowed decreases due to the effects of cumulative dose. This is not always the case for AEGL-1 values, however, since they represent a threshold for non-disabling outcomes and sometimes only depend on air concentration.

See also
 Immediately dangerous to life or health
 Lethal dose

References

Chemical safety
Emergency management
Firefighting in the United States
Medical emergencies
National Institute for Occupational Safety and Health
Occupational Safety and Health Administration
Toxicology